Regional State Archives in Kongsberg is a regional state archives situated in Kongsberg, Norway. Part of the National Archival Services of Norway, it is responsible for archiving documents from state institutions in the counties of Buskerud, Telemark and Vestfold. The agency is the youngest regional state archive, opening in 1994. Prior to this, documents from the three counties were stored at the Regional State Archives in Oslo. The archive has about 14 shelf-kilometers of material. Intermunicipal Archives of Buskerud, Vestfold and Telemark moved to an adjoining building in 2014, allowing the two to share a common reading room and conservation facilities.

References

National Archival Services of Norway
Organisations based in Kongsberg
1994 establishments in Norway
Government agencies established in 1994